Back Bay is a bay  wide along the west coast of Graham Land, Antarctica. Its entrance lies between Stonington Island and Fitzroy Island, with the head of the bay formed by Northeast Glacier. The bay was first surveyed by the US Antarctic Service, 1939–41, and so named by them because of its location at the rear (north-east) side of Stonington Island.

References 

Bays of Graham Land
Fallières Coast